Minuscule 286 (in the Gregory-Aland numbering), ε 528 (Soden), is a Greek minuscule manuscript of the New Testament, on paper. It is dated by a colophon to the year 1432. 
It has marginalia.

Description 

The codex contains a complete text of the four Gospels on 264 paper leaves. The text is written in one column per page, in 21 lines per page.

There is also a division according to the smaller Ammonian Sections (in Mark 232 Sections, the last in 16:6), with references to the Eusebian Canons (written below Ammonian Section numbers).

It contains the Paschal Canon for the years 1432-1502.

Text 

The Greek text of the codex is a representative of the Byzantine text-type. Hermann von Soden did not assign it to any of the textual families. Aland placed it in Category V. 
According to the Claremont Profile Method it represents text of Kx.

History 

The manuscript was written by monk Calistus, with the Paschal canon for the years 1432-1502. The manuscript was added to the list of New Testament manuscripts by Scholz (1794-1852).

It was examined and described by Paulin Martin. C. R. Gregory saw the manuscript in 1885.

The manuscript is currently housed at the Bibliothèque nationale de France (Gr. 96) at Paris.

See also 

 List of New Testament minuscules
 Biblical manuscript
 Textual criticism

References

Further reading 

 Jean-Pierre-Paul Martin, Description technique des manuscrits grecs, relatif au Nouveau Testament, conservé dans les bibliothèques des Paris (Paris 1883), p. 70.

External links 
 

Greek New Testament minuscules
15th-century biblical manuscripts
Bibliothèque nationale de France collections